Gungahlin Jets Australian Football and Netball Club is an Australian sports club based in Gungahlin, Australian Capital Territory. The Australian rules football squad competes in the AFL Canberra first grade competition. The club has also a netball section.

History
The Gungahlin Jets were established in 1981 and entered the Monaro AFL division 2 competition in 1982. The club won the MAFL division 2 premiership in their first season.

In 2014, the Liberal government withdrew a $66,000 grant for infrastructure funding provided by the previous Labor government, sparking a controversy. The club was burgled twice in a month; drinks and water bottles intended for fundraising were stolen, and on the second occasion, a television.

The club anticipated fielding 400 players across senior, junior and women's divisions in the 2014 season.

The Jets won their first 1st grade match in over six years on 7 May 2022 against Tuggeranong Valley Football Club.

Honours
Monaro Australian Football League
 Division 2 (5): 1982, 1987, 1988, 1989, 1994
AFL Canberra
 Division 2 (3): 2006, 2007, 2008

Grand Finals

References

External links
 

AFL Canberra clubs
1981 establishments in Australia
Australian rules football clubs established in 1981